Sky Meadows State Park is a  park in the Virginia state park system. It is located in extreme northwest Fauquier County, Virginia in the Blue Ridge Mountains, near Paris, Virginia. It is about an hour outside of the Washington, D.C. metro region.

History and amenities
The park was formed when Paul Mellon donated  of land in 1975. The name Sky Meadows came from former owner Sir Robert Hadow, who named the property "Skye Farm" after the Isle of Skye in the Inner Hebrides of Scotland. The park opened to the public in August 1983. It has expanded its borders twice since then— were added in 1987, containing the Appalachian Trail, and in 1991 Mellon donated an additional , bringing the park to its present size.

It starts in a valley between the foothills and the Blue Ridge Mountains, then has meadows and forests stretching up to the ridge of the mountain and the Appalachian Trail.

The horse trails are east of US 17 and the hiking trails (and most of the park) is west of US 17.

With a combination of meadows, grazed fields, forest, scrub, and streams, it has a wide variety of ecological zones.

Most of the year, there are monthly "astronomy nights" where amateur astronomers bring their telescopes and use them to show attendees various celestial objects. Typically, an astronomer from the Smithsonian Institution is among the leaders.

Sky Meadows is a year-round bird watching site. It is known for a colony of red-headed woodpeckers that live in an oak grove just past the contact station. Depending on the time of the year, it is almost certain that this and the other six species of woodpeckers—downy, hairy, red-bellied, yellow-bellied sapsucker, pileated, and northern flicker—commonly found in this part of Virginia will be present.

Except for "astronomy nights", the park closes at dusk, and campers must be in the park and others out of the park at that time.

Mt. Bleak-Skye Farm
Mt. Bleak-Skye Farm is a national historic district located in Sky Meadows State Park. The district encompasses 23 contributing buildings including barns, 1 contributing site, and 3 contributing structures dating between 1780 and 1954. The oldest is the -story, Wayside Cottage dated to about 1780. It also includes the Timberlake farmstead, Federal-style Mount Bleak mansion, and the frame Meeting House.

It was listed on the National Register of Historic Places in 2004.

See also
 List of Virginia state parks
 List of Virginia state forests

References

External links
Official website of Sky Meadows State Park
Sky Meadows State Park in World Database on Protected Areas
Audubon Society of Northern Virginia (ASNV) Birding Hotspot Factsheet

Houses on the National Register of Historic Places in Virginia
Farms on the National Register of Historic Places in Virginia
Federal architecture in Virginia
Houses completed in 1780
Houses in Fauquier County, Virginia
National Register of Historic Places in Fauquier County, Virginia
State parks of Virginia
Parks in Fauquier County, Virginia
Blue Ridge Mountains
Protected areas established in 1975
1975 establishments in Virginia